is a Japanese historical fantasy manga series written and illustrated by Yuuho Ashibe. Set in Ireland and Roman Britain, the story follows a black-haired girl named Arianrhod and her fight against Balor Evil-Eye, the Gothic warlord who destroyed her home tribe. Joining her in the fight are Henruda, the daughter of a Celtic chieftain, and Legion, the Silver Knight. Crystal Dragon began serialization in Akita Shoten's monthly  (girls') manga magazine Bonita in 1981, later transferring to its sister magazine Mystery Bonita. The series went on hiatus from 2007 to 2014, during which Ashibe resumed her other long-running manga series, Bride of Deimos. It went on hiatus again in summer 2020 due to unspecified circumstances. In April 2021, Ashibe announced that the series is nearing its climax. Akita Shoten has published 30  (compiled volumes) of Crystal Dragon under the Bonita Comics imprint as of November 2020; the company also published 12  (paperback novel-sized volumes) under the Akita Bunko imprint from July 2003 to July 2007. Internationally, the series is licensed in Indonesia by Elex Media Komputindo.

References

1981 manga
Akita Shoten manga
Historical fantasy anime and manga
Shōjo manga